Kelly Dawn Craft (born February 24, 1962) is an American businesswoman, political donor, politician, and former diplomat who served as the United States ambassador to the United Nations from 2019 to 2021. Craft previously served as the United States ambassador to Canada from 2017 to 2019, the first woman to hold the office. She earlier was appointed by President George W. Bush as a US alternate delegate to the United Nations in 2007, where her focus included US engagement in Africa. 

Craft serves on the advisory board of the Canadian American Business Council and heads Kelly G. Knight LLC, a business advisory firm based in Lexington, Kentucky. She is running in the Republican primary for Governor of Kentucky in 2023.

Early life and education
Craft was born in Lexington, Kentucky, a daughter of the late Dr. Bobby Guilfoil and Sherry Dale Guilfoil, who both died in 2011. She grew up just outside Glasgow, a small town in rural central Kentucky.

Her father was the town veterinarian in Glasgow, and he farmed and raised cows and horses. He was active in the  Democratic Party, and in his later years served as chairman of the Barren County, Kentucky Democratic Party. He was also a deacon of the First Christian Church in Glasgow, and served on the local board of health. Her mother was a home economics teacher at Glasgow High School, a public high school. Her mother sewed the family’s clothing, and the house’s draperies.  She has a younger sister, Micah Guilfoil Payne (a lawyer in Glasgow), and a younger brother, Marc Guilfoil (executive director of the Kentucky Horse Racing Commission).

She grew up in a middle class family.  Craft played clarinet in the high school band at Glasgow High School, and graduated in 1980.

Craft then created her own interdisciplinary major, with an emphasis on international law, at the University of Kentucky in Lexington.  She graduated with a B.A. in 1984.

Consulting firm

In 2004, Craft started a marketing, strategic management, leadership advice, and business consulting firm, Kelly G. Knight, LLC. Its principal office is in Lexington.

Political involvement and donations; philanthropy
Craft was initially active in local politics and civic causes, such as helping the poor, and raising funds for the arts. She has been a generous donor to and supporter of primarily Republican political candidates. In 2004, Craft was a prominent supporter of President George W. Bush. In 2012 she was the Kentucky finance committee chairwoman for Mitt Romney’s presidential campaign. She also raised money for then-governor Ernie Fletcher, and congressmen Hal Rogers and Ron Lewis.

The Crafts have strongly supported then-Senate Majority Leader Mitch McConnell. She is also an influencer in Kentuckian affairs. Craft has also supported both Democratic Kentucky Governor Andy Beshear, and former Kentucky Governor, Republican Matt Bevin.

She was a delegate to the 2016 Republican National Convention from Kentucky. That year, Craft and her husband Joe Craft donated millions of dollars to candidates for the 2016 Republican nomination for president. The couple initially supported Marco Rubio, but in June 2016 moved their support to Donald Trump and contributed more than $2 million to his campaign, in part because he agreed with them in private that he wouldn’t replace House Speaker Paul Ryan or Senate Majority Leader Mitch McConnell, whom they supported. Political commentator Scott Jennings said that their support gave Trump instant credibility.

Separate from politics, Craft has been a philanthropist and the couple has donated to philanthropic causes. In 2015 they co-founded the Craft Academy for Excellence in Science and Mathematics at Kentucky's Morehead State University, a special program for academically exceptional high school students . By 2019 they had committed over $10 million to the Academy. They have also donated substantial sums to the University of Kentucky.

Craft served on the University of Kentucky Board of Trustees for a term beginning in August 2016, but resigned to accept the US ambassadorship to Canada a year later. She has also served on the boards of directors of the Salvation Army, the Lexington Philharmonic, the United Way of the Bluegrass, the YMCA of Central Kentucky, the Kentucky Arts Council, and the Center for Rural Development (a nonprofit dedicated to economic development in rural Kentucky).

US Alternate Delegate to the United Nations

President George W. Bush appointed Craft an alternate delegate to the United Nations in 2007, for the 62nd Session of the General Assembly of the United Nations. On October 24, 2007, Senator Joe Biden reported favorably on her nomination on behalf of the Senate Committee on Foreign Relations. On October 26, she was confirmed by the United States Senate by voice vote.

As part of the US delegation, her responsibilities included advising the US Ambassador to the UN on US engagement in Africa. She also gave a speech to the UN General Assembly on the investment the US and other nations were making to fight HIV/AIDS in Africa and malaria in Africa, and promote development there. She later said: "President Bush’s example and his initiative to cure AIDS on the African continent instilled in me the value of using diplomatic positions to help the less fortunate. And that’s what I am going to do."

US Ambassador to Canada

On June 15, 2017, Craft was nominated by President Donald Trump to become the US ambassador to Canada, with the support of Senator Mitch McConnell. She was confirmed by the United States Senate by unanimous voice vote on August 3, and assumed office on October 23.

Craft became the 31st United States Ambassador to Canada. She also became the first woman to hold the job. In her first week as ambassador to Canada, Craft said in an interview with CBC News that when it came to climate change she appreciated all of the scientific evidence, and thought that "both sides have their own results, from their studies, and I appreciate and I respect both sides of the science." She played a leadership role in trade negotiations between the US and Canada, resulting in the signing of a new free trade agreement with the US, Canada, and Mexico (the U.S.-Mexico-Canada Agreement; USMCA), which replaced the North American Free Trade Agreement (NAFTA). Her work in hammering out the tri-lateral agreement raised her stock with the Trump administration. In addition during her tenure the relationship between the countries was the subject of controversial steel tariffs, and critical comments by Trump about the Canadian prime minister. In June 2018, as US-Canadian relations grew testy, an envelope was mailed to her containing a suspicious white powder and a death threat.

According to a June 2019 report in Politico, Craft was frequently away from her Ottawa post during her tenure as ambassador, though the report acknowledged that US State Department officials said that many of her trips were related to the new North American trade agreement. During a 15-month period, she took 128 flights between Ottawa and the United States, equal to a round trip per week. Seventy had Lexington as the origin or destination, which raised questions to some as to whether the trips were for personal reasons.  A State Department spokesperson explained, however, that all of Craft’s personal and official travel "to and from the United States, including numerous trips associated with USMCA [US-Canada-Mexico trade deal] negotiations, were pre-approved by the State Department and complied with all Department travel guidelines," that the number of her personal absences did not exceed State Department limits, and in addition that Craft chose to cover all her travel expenses from her personal funds, "saving the U.S. government substantial money." Separately, a US official said that Craft was often in Washington for trade negotiations in which she was directly involved, that she would also fly to other places in the United States to promote the trade deal which was one of the president's top priorities, and also explained that Craft would during the course of these travels sometimes spend the weekend at her Kentucky home rather than return to Ottawa, which did not count toward the "26 [work] days" away from her post limitation.  Per State Department rules, an ambassador may only spend 26 "work days" away from a post without first obtaining special State Department approval, and she testified that each of her trips was in fact made with State Department approval. The State Department and Craft do not provide records of Craft's schedule and the number of days she was in Ottawa, but the newspaper said she spent 300 days (more than half her term) away from her Ottawa post. Craft herself likewise insisted that all of her trips were taken in accordance with US State Department regulations, and with State Department approval, with much of the time spent negotiating the trade deal with Canada and Mexico in Washington, D.C. She also pledged to the Senate Foreign Relations Committee to deliver to it all of her travel records for her time as U.S. ambassador to Canada. Senator Marco Rubio commented: "I have a sneaking suspicion that having you here (for trade talks) or having you attend a cocktail party at some embassy, we would prefer you would prioritize the trade deal."

Canadian Prime Minister Justin Trudeau thanked Craft for what he said was her "dedication to building on the strong relationship between our two countries," and her help in "securing a new North American trade deal that increases the prosperity of both Canada and the United States." Former Canadian Ambassador to the United States Frank McKenna said that Craft brought "charm and grace and listening skills" to the ambassadorship, and did “the job very well when at the top, the relationship is as bad as it’s ever been." Ontario Premier Doug Ford gave her tenure a positive review, saying "Every premier I know thinks the world of her. She really proved herself over some tough times."

US Ambassador to the United Nations

On February 22, 2019, Trump announced his intention to nominate Craft to be the next United States Ambassador to the United Nations, replacing Nikki Haley, who had resigned two months prior, after his first replacement choice, Heather Nauert, withdrew herself from consideration. US National Security Advisor John Bolton and US Secretary of State Mike Pompeo both agreed that Craft was qualified and the most logical choice to replace Haley. Pompeo said she: "has been an outstanding advocate for America's national security and economic interests in Canada and she is extremely well-qualified to do the same at the United Nations." On May 2, Trump formally sent Craft's nomination to the United States Senate. On June 19, a hearing on her nomination was held before the US Senate Foreign Relations Committee. During the hearing Craft said "Israel ... is the subject of unrelenting bias and hostility in UN venues. The United States will never accept such bias, and if confirmed I commit to seizing every opportunity to shine a light on this conduct, call it what it is, and demand that these outrageous practices finally come to an end." Although Craft had previously said during her tenure as Ambassador to Canada that she believed there were "good scientists on both sides” of the climate debate, during her confirmation hearing she altered her position, saying that she believed that fossil fuels and human behavior have contributed to climate change. Due to her family's connections to the coal industry, she also said she would recuse herself from any UN discussions involving climate change or coal. On July 25, 2019, her nomination was reported out of committee by a vote of 15–7, with Democratic Senators Jeanne Shaheen, Chris Coons, and Chris Murphy voting for her, as well as all Republicans. On July 30, the US Senate voted 57–33 to invoke cloture on her nomination. On July 31, her nomination was confirmed by a vote of 56–34.

She was formally sworn in by Vice President Mike Pence on September 10, 2019. Craft formally presented her credentials to UN Secretary-General António Guterres on September 12, 2019.

2019

When the UN General Assembly voted to add Venezuela to the UN Human Rights Council in October 2019, Craft wrote: "I am personally aggrieved that 105 countries voted in favor of this affront to human life and dignity. It provides ironclad proof that the Human Rights Council is broken, and reinforces why the United States withdrew." Venezuela had been accused of withholding from the Venezuelan people humanitarian aid delivered from other nations, and of manipulating its voters in exchange for food and medical care. The council had been criticized regularly for admitting members who were themselves suspected of human rights violations. The US left the council in 2018, protesting the Council's frequent denunciations of Israel.

Speaking to the UN Security Council in October 2019, she called Hamas "a terrorist organization that oppresses the Palestinian people in Gaza through intimidation and outright violence, while inciting violence against Israel." She condemned as "despicable"  Hamas's violence against its own people, its use of Palestinian children as pawns, and its indiscriminate attacks on Israeli civilian areas, and called it one of the greatest obstacles to resolving the Israeli-Palestinian conflict.

In November 2019, Craft met with President of Haiti Jovenel Moïse at the Haiti National Palace about ways to implement a consensual resolution of Haiti's political crisis through inclusive dialogue. Craft later met with political leaders from other Haitian  parties, listened to their different views, and urged an inclusive solution with Moïse. She also urged the Haitian government to fight corruption, investigate and prosecute human rights abusers, and combat narcotics and human trafficking.

In December 2019, Craft said during a meeting of the UN Security Council that was called at her request that the US was prepared to take "simultaneous steps" with North Korea to achieve peace. But she also warned the North Koreans against conducting further missile tests.

2020

In January 2020, after the US killed Iranian Major General Qassim Suleimani, who had led the Quds Force, in a drone strike, Craft wrote a letter to the UN Security Council in which she said that the act was one of self-defense. At the same time, she wrote in the letter that the US stood "ready to engage without preconditions in serious negotiations with Iran, with the goal of preventing further endangerment of international peace and security or escalation by the Iranian regime."

In May 2020, Craft spoke at a session of the UN Security Council, and said that the Council must ensure that armed groups in Lebanon such as the Islamist Hezbollah are disarmed, and that the role of the UN Interim Force in Lebanon (UNIFIL) is strengthened so that it can effectively  investigate Hezbollah’s violations. She also said the US was deeply concerned about Iran’s and Syria’s transfers of weaponry to Hezbollah.

On August 13, 2020, Craft celebrated the announcement of diplomatic relations between the United Arab Emirates and Israel, calling it “a huge win” for Trump and for the world, saying that the diplomatic ties show “just how hungry for peace we all are in this world,” and saying that Mideast countries understand the need “to stand firm against a regime that is the number one state sponsor of terrorism”—Iran.

Speaking about Iran and the US desire to restore UN sanctions against it and extend an embargo to arms sales to the country in 2020, Craft said: "History is replete of tragedies of appeasing regimes such as this one, that for decades have kept its own people under its thumb. The Trump administration has no fear in standing in limited company on this matter, in light of the unmistakable truth guiding our actions. I only regret that other members of this [Security Council] have lost their way, and now find themselves standing in the company of terrorists." She also wrote a September 20, 2021, letter to the President of the UN Security Council, pressing her point on sanctions. Speaking at the US State Department in September 2020, she said: "As we have in the past, we will stand alone to protect peace and security at all times. We don’t need a cheering section to validate our moral compass."

In mid-September 2020, Craft met with James K.J. Lee, director-general of the Taipei Economic and Cultural Office in New York, for lunch in New York City. He had been secretary-general in Taiwan’s Ministry of Foreign Affairs until July. It was the first meeting between a top Taiwan official and a United States Ambassador to the United Nations. Craft said they discussed ways the US can help Taiwan become more engaged within the UN, and she pointed to a December 2019 email early alert from Taiwan that WHO had ignored, which had warned about the danger of the person-to-person transmission of the new highly contagious Covid-19 virus in China.

Later in September 2020, at a UN Security Council meeting to discuss challenges related to “Post-COVID-19 Global Governance,” after her fellow members veered off onto other topics only tangentially related to the virus, Craft criticized them for using a COVID-19 meeting to focus on what she called "political grudges," rather than the pandemic. She said: "You know, shame on each of you. I am astonished and I am disgusted by the content of today’s discussion. I am actually really quite ashamed of this council – members of the council who took this opportunity to focus on political grudges rather than the critical issue at hand."

In December 2020 she said that the UN Human Rights Council was "a haven for despots and dictators, hostile to Israel, and ineffectual on true human rights crises." Remarking on China's and Venezuela's human-rights records, she said the Council "includes the voices of the very human-rights violators it was designed to counter." Speaking to the Council’s treatment of Israel, Craft said: "We must deal with the insanity at the center of the Human Rights Council's persistent and egregious anti-Israel bias... No other country is targeted in this way – not the murderous Assad regime in Syria, not the disastrous Maduro regime in Venezuela, and not the Chinese Communist Party responsible for abuses; not Russia, Cuba, or North Korea. Israel, only Israel..."

2021
In January 2021, Craft met with Taiwan President Tsai Ing-wen by video link. Craft said: "We discussed the many ways Taiwan is a model for the world, as demonstrated by its success in fighting Covid-19 and all that Taiwan has to offer in the fields of health, technology and cutting-edge science.... the U.S. stands with Taiwan and always will." Speaking in Beijing,  Chinese Ministry of Foreign Affairs spokesman Zhao Lijian said: "Certain U.S. politicians will pay a heavy price for their wrong words and deeds." On her last day in office later that month, Craft called Taiwan "a force for good on the global stage -- a vibrant democracy, a generous humanitarian actor, a responsible actor in the global health community, and a vigorous promoter and defender of human rights."

On January 20, 2021, days after Craft's call with the Taiwan President, China imposed sanctions against Craft (who in addition, had sent a letter to the UN secretary general criticizing China’s “excessive maritime claims” in the South China Sea), Pompeo, and 26 other former Trump officials. President Biden's National Security Council called the sanctions "unproductive and cynical."

Campaign for Governor of Kentucky

From the time of her departure from the Trump administration, there had been speculation that Craft would run in the 2023 Kentucky gubernatorial election. Craft declared her candidacy for governor of Kentucky on September 7, 2022. Weeks after launching her campaign, Craft chose Kentucky state senator Max Wise to be her running mate. 

Her campaign has put focus into the process of lowering the state crime rate. In January 2023, she vowed to apply a "full court press" to combat the Chinese Communist Party's contributions to the fentanyl crisis plaguing the United States if she is elected governor of Kentucky.

Craft was considered to have a monetary advantage over her opponents, as she raised $751,597 within the first three weeks of her campaign, the second-highest Republican fundraising total behind Agriculture Commissioner Ryan Quarles; by the end of 2022 she had taken over the Republican candidates' lead in fundraising. In December, she became the first candidate to spend over $100,000 on television commercials.

Personal life
Craft married David Moross and then Judson Knight, and has two daughters.  She wed Joe Craft in April 2016. A Hazard, Kentucky, native and University of Kentucky College of Law graduate, he is a billionaire coal-mining executive for Alliance Resource Partners, L.P., the second-largest coal producer in the eastern United States. The couple share six children and, as of 2018, 11 grandchildren.

References

External links

 
 

"CBS News exclusive interview with U.S. Ambassador to the U.N. Kelly Craft," CBS News, September 25, 2020.

|-

1962 births
Living people
21st-century American women politicians
21st-century American politicians
Ambassadors of the United States to Canada
Kentucky Republicans
Kentucky women in politics
People from Glasgow, Kentucky
Permanent Representatives of the United States to the United Nations
Politicians from Lexington, Kentucky
Trump administration personnel
University of Kentucky alumni
American women ambassadors
American women diplomats